Puzeh Do Demeh (also Romanized as Pūzeh Do Demeh; also known as Pūzehdeymeh) is a village in Charam Rural District, in the Central District of Charam County, Kohgiluyeh and Boyer-Ahmad Province, Iran. At the 2006 census, its population was 26, in 5 families.

References 

Populated places in Charam County